Maajja (stylised in all lowercase) is an independent record label and distribution company based out of Toronto and Chennai. Unlike traditional record labels, the label does not own their artists’ master recordings.

History

2021―present: Formation 
Maajja was founded by Canadian tech entrepreneurs, Noel Kirthiraj, Sen Sachi, Prasana Balachandran, in collaboration with A.R. Rahman as a "technology-enabled label alternative" created with artists in mind.

Maajja was announced to the public on 26 January 2021 in a video, presented by A.R. Rahman, on the maajja YouTube channel.

Mission 

Maajja aims to establish sustainable careers for their artists, hence the label not owning master recordings and all copyrights remaining with the artists when they release music via the label.

Artists

Soloists 
 Dhee
 Arivu
 Shan Vincent de Paul
 Navz-47
 Ami
 Shashaa Tirupati
 Satthia
 Tha Mystro
 Pravin Saivi
 Sakthi Amaran
 Maalavika Sundar

Groups 
 Two's a Company
 The Casteless Collective
 Kothu Boys
 Staccato

Producers 
 A.R. Rahman
 Santhosh Narayanan
 ofRo
 Pravin Mani
 Steve Cliff

Discography 

-

References

Canadian independent record labels
Indian record labels
Record labels established in 2021